The County class is a class of offshore patrol vessels built for the Jamaica Defence Force Coast Guard (JDF). Based on the Dutch Damen Stan 4207 patrol vessel, the first vessel entered service in 2005. Three were originally purchased, but only one remains in service with the JDF. In 2017, an additional two vessels were purchased and both remain in service as of 2023. The Jamaican vessels are equipped with a stern launching ramp, capable of deploying and retrieving a small jet boat, for rescue or pursuit. The vessels' bridge electronics were supplied by Alphatron Marine.

Ships in class
They were delivered in 2005 and 2006.

Service history 
In 2012 the Jamaican Fire Brigade had only one of its four fireboats operational, and had requested that the County-class patrol vessels help fill in until its more modern replacement vessels were delivered.

In 2017 Nicaragua purchased the original Cornwall and Middlesex. In 2019, Middlesex was purchased from the Nicaraguan Navy by the Saint Vincent and the Grenadines Coast Guard and renamed Captain Hugh Mulzac.

References

External links

Patrol boat classes
Military of Jamaica